Tupu may refer to:

People
 Lani Tupu, New Zealand actor
 Tania Tupu (born 1973), New Zealand basketball player
 Tupu Atanatiu Taingakawa Te Waharoa (1844–1929), New Zealand tribal leader
 Tupu Ulufale (born 1987), Samoan rugby league football player

Other
 Tupu (TV series)
 , Incan unit of length